Erik Holmberg may refer to:

 Erik Holmberg (footballer) (1922–1998), Norwegian football defender
 Erik Holmberg (singer) (born 1970), musician in the Swedish band Dive
 Erik Holmberg (astronomer) (1908–2000), Swedish astronomer and cosmologist

See also
 Holmberg (disambiguation)